Graeme Archer (born 1 February  1967) is a Scottish lawn bowler from Edinburgh.

Bowls career
He was National champion in 1995.

In 2011 he won the fours gold medal and triples silver medal at the Atlantic Bowls Championships.

He won the lawn bowls gold medal in the triples competition at the 2012 World Outdoor Bowls Championship. In 2014 he married English international bowler Carol Ashby.

References

1967 births
Living people
Scottish male bowls players
Bowls World Champions